The Revolutionary Democratic Coalition  (also translated as 'Democratic Revolutionary Coalition') (also called the United Revolutionary Front) was an electoral alliance in Egypt. It is also active in protests as recently as May 2013. The alliance has been described as being composed of "small socialist, communist and radical parties."

Member organisations 
 Socialist Popular Alliance Party
 Tagammu Party
 Egyptian Communist Party
 Socialist Party of Egypt
 Workers Democratic Party
 Socialist Revolutionary Movement (January)
 Egyptian Coalition to Fight Corruption
 Mina Daniel Movement
 Socialist Youth Union
 Workers and Peasants Party 
 Democratic Popular Movement

References

2012 establishments in Egypt
Defunct left-wing political party alliances
Defunct political party alliances in Egypt
Socialism in Egypt
Egypt